Nonaspe or Nonasp is a municipality located in the province of Saragossa, Aragon, Spain. According to the 2004 census (INE), the municipality has a population of 1,042 inhabitants.
This town is located in La Franja, the local dialect is a variant of Catalan.

Historically this town and its municipal term were considered part of the Matarranya, but presently it is included in the Bajo Aragón-Caspe/Baix Aragó-Casp comarca.

See also
Bajo Aragón-Caspe/Baix Aragó-Casp
Matarraña/Matarranya
La Franja

References

External links 

Nonaspe Town Hall - Official site

Municipalities in the Province of Zaragoza